David Olatunji Abioye is a Nigerian Christian author and preacher, the First Vice President of the Living Faith Church Worldwide. He is a bishop and  the Senior Pastor of the Abuja church, Living Faith Church, Goshen City with over 30,000 worshippers.

Personal life
Born in 1961 into a family from Kwara State, Abioye is married to Mary Abioye; they have three children – David Jnr., Ruth and Daniel. He studied Mechanical Engineering from the University of Ilorin. He worked as a lecturer at Open Cast Polytechnic, Auchi, from 1985 till 1985.

Ministry 
While still lecturing at the Polytechnic, he wanted to start a technological firm to solidify his finances. However, when he met future founder of Living Faith Church Worldwide, David Oyedepo at a Christian Student Fellowship in the 1980's, he was inspired by the what he saw as his passion and love for God. Over the years, their relationship transcends from brotherly friendship to a spiritual mentor.  After the departure of Oyedepo to Lagos, Abioye was the senior pastor of Garden of Faith, Kaduna, which was the former national headquarters of the church. In 1993, he became a bishop in the church. 

In January 2014, Nigeria's president, Goodluck Jonathan visited Abioye, and worshiped during one of the services in the Abuja church. In June 2015, shortly after the election, the Speaker of the House of Representatives of Nigeria, Yakubu Dogara had a thanksgiving session in his church.

Book Publishing 
Abioye has published over 10 Christian, inspirational and motivational books, mini books, magazines and other resources. They include:

 Making the Most of Opportunity
 Productive Thinking
 The Lifestyle of Faith
 Wisdom From Above
 Releasing The Creative Power of The Mind
 Overcoming Stagnation
 Courage for Conquest
 Creating a New Beginning
 Experiencing God in Prayer
 Stewardship the Pathway to Honour
 Spiritual apprenticeship 
 Strategies for Success

References 

Living people
Yoruba Christian clergy
Nigerian bishops
Nigerian Pentecostal pastors
Nigerian Christian writers
20th-century Protestant religious leaders
21st-century Protestant religious leaders
Year of birth missing (living people)
20th-century Nigerian clergy
21st-century Nigerian clergy